The Miss Bahamas 2012 pageant was held on July 30, 2012. Twenty candidates competed for the national crown. The chosen winner will represent The Bahamas at the Miss Universe 2012 and Miss International 2012 pageants. The costume of the winner of the best national costume award will be used at Miss Universe 2012. Miss World Bahamas will enter Miss World 2013. The First Runner Up entered Miss Intercontinental, the Second Runner Up entered Miss Supranational, and the Third Runner Up entered Top Model of the World. This is the last time Miss Bahamas World and Miss Bahamas Universe were held together in one Miss Bahamas pageant. After this, the Miss Bahamas Organization restructured the contest into two separate Miss Bahamas pageants, one to crown Miss Bahamas for Miss World and the other to crown Miss Bahamas for Miss Universe.

Final results

Special awards

Miss Photogenic - De'Andra Bannister (Crooked Island)
Miss Congeniality - Rakia Rolle (Bimini)
Best National Costume - De'Andra Bannister (Crooked Island)

Official delegates

External links

Miss Bahamas
Bahamas, The
2012 in the Bahamas